False Faces is a 1943 American mystery film directed by George Sherman and written by Curt Siodmak. The film stars Stanley Ridges, Veda Ann Borg, William "Bill" Henry, Janet Shaw, Rex Williams and John Maxwell. The film was released on May 28, 1943, by Republic Pictures.

Plot

Cast       
Stanley Ridges as District Attorney Stanley Harding
Veda Ann Borg as Joyce Ford
William "Bill" Henry as Don Westcott
Janet Shaw as Diana Harding
Rex Williams as Craig Harding
John Maxwell as Assistant District Attorney Stewart
Joseph Crehan as Police Capt. Alan O'Brien
Dick Wessel as Detective Mallory
Chester Clute as Apartment Manager
Etta McDaniel as Magnolia
Nick Stewart as Mack 
Claire Whitney as Agnes Harding
Billy Nelson as Jimmy
Dick Elliott as Desk Sergeant
John Dilson as Coroner Burnett

References

External links
 

1943 films
1940s English-language films
American mystery films
1943 mystery films
Republic Pictures films
Films directed by George Sherman
American black-and-white films
1940s American films